Rainbow Tribe may refer to: 

 Josephine Baker's chosen family and intentional community, the Rainbow Tribe
 The Legend of the Rainbow Warriors, a belief held by some modern environmentalists that they are fulfilling a Native American prophecy
 Rainbow Family, a counter-culture hippie group, best known for their camping festival, the
 Rainbow Gathering
 Rainbow nation, Desmond Tutu's term for post-apartheid South Africa